Black Pied cattle refer to a range of cattle breeds, including:

 Chinese Black Pied cattle
 German Black Pied cattle or Dutch Black Pied Cattle
 German Black Pied Dairy cattle
 Russian Black Pied cattle